The Savoia-Marchetti SM.91 was a two-seat, twin-engined, Italian heavy fighter prototype, designed to compete in a 1942 revision to a long-range fighter-bomber contract offered by the Regia Aeronautica to Italian aircraft companies in 1938. The original 1938 specification yielded the Savoia-Marchetti SM.88, which the SM.91 was largely based on.

Design and development
The armament should consist of six MG 151 cannons in the nose and wings and a 12.7 mm Breda-SAFAT machine gun as a defensive weapon. It should have an  bomb load. At that point, the request for a long-range fighter killed the SM.88, still in development, and the SM.91, a larger, heavier and more modern design, was authorized.

The fuselage and the wings were all-metal, to achieve the best performance regardless of cost. The central nacelle held the crew of two, and the wings and tail were similar to the SM.88.

The two DB 605 engines gave a total of 2,950 hp. The aircraft's maximum speed at 585 km/h (363 mph) was better than the SM.88. There were three 20 mm MG 151s in the nose. Two more were mounted in the wings, close to the fuselage. Another machine gun was provided for the rear gunner.

The prototype, designated MM.530, flew for the first time on 11 March 1943, tested by Aldo Moggi. There were two prototypes, the second a modified SM.88 prototype.

The machine flew at Vergiate and logged 27 hours in the next few months. It was advanced, but was not entered into the official tests at Guidonia, perhaps because it was still undergoing testing. The first prototype was captured and sent to Germany in October 1943, after which it vanished and is presumed destroyed. The second prototype was captured by the Germans incomplete when they occupied northern Italy in September 1943. This aircraft was tested on 10 July 1944, but was destroyed by Allied bombers later in the year.

Specifications (SM.91)

See also

References

 Lembo, Daniele, I bifusoliera della Regia, Storia militare magazine, Westward editions, n.11, April–May 2000

External links

 Might Have Beens: Italian Twin-Engined Fighters, 1943 – worldatwar.net

sm.091
Abandoned military aircraft projects of Italy
World War II Italian fighter aircraft
Savoia-Marchetti SM.91
Low-wing aircraft
Aircraft first flown in 1943
1940s Italian fighter aircraft
Twin piston-engined tractor aircraft